Paul Evans is a Republican member of the Illinois House of Representatives, representing the 102nd district. He was selected for the seat on August 13, 2011 after Ron Stephens retired.  He was sworn into office on August 26, 2011  He will be running for reelection in the new 108th district in 2012.

Evans has worked in Southwestern Illinois as an attorney for nearly 20 years, and has previously served as the Zoning Hearing Officer for the cities of O'Fallon and New Baden, as well as serving on Metro-East Parks and Recreation District Board for 10 years.  Evans is currently the Vice-President of the O’Fallon Chamber of Commerce.

Evans serves on six house committees:  Appropriations-Human Services, Appropriations-Public Safety, Small Business Empowerment & Workforce Development, Tourism & Conventions, Consumer Protection and Environmental Health.

Political Positions
Evans believes in lower taxes to drive economic growth in Illinois, saying "If Illinois is to improve our business climate, we must grow our way out of our troubles which originated from the Chicago Democrat tax hikes."

References

External links 
 State Representative Paul Evans Facebook Page

Republican Party members of the Illinois House of Representatives
Living people
Southern Illinois University Carbondale alumni
Year of birth missing (living people)